is a Japanese footballer currently playing as a forward or a winger for Kawasaki Frontale.

Career
After three good seasons with Honda FC in JFL, Kawasaki Frontale opted to sign Tono for 2020 season.

The club decided to loan him to Avispa Fukuoka in J2 League.

Career statistics

Club
.

Notes

Honours

Club
J1 League: 2021
Japanese Super Cup: 2021

References

External links

Profile at Avispa Fukuoka

1999 births
Living people
People from Fujieda, Shizuoka
Association football people from Shizuoka Prefecture
Japanese footballers
Association football forwards
Japan Football League players
J1 League players
J2 League players
Honda FC players
Kawasaki Frontale players
Avispa Fukuoka players